"You're the Nearest Thing to Heaven" is a song co-written and originally recorded by Johnny Cash.

The song was released as a single (Sun 302 with "The Ways of a Woman in Love" on the opposite side) in August 1958.

Background

Charts

References 

Johnny Cash songs
1958 singles

Sun Records singles
1958 songs